Laurence Henry Tribe (born October 10, 1941) is an American legal scholar who is a University Professor Emeritus at Harvard University. He previously served as the Carl M. Loeb University Professor at Harvard Law School.

A constitutional law scholar, Tribe is co-founder of the American Constitution Society. He is also the author of American Constitutional Law (1978), a major treatise in that field, and has argued before the United States Supreme Court 36 times. Tribe was elected to the American Philosophical Society in 2010.

Personal life and education
Tribe was born in 1941 in Shanghai, which was then part of the Republic of China but had been taken over by the Empire of Japan in 1937 following the Battle of Shanghai. He was the son of Paulina (née Diatlovitsky) and George Israel Tribe. His family is Jewish. His father was from Poland and his mother was born in Harbin to immigrants from Eastern Europe. Tribe spent his early years in the French Concession of Shanghai before his family immigrated to the United States when he was six years old. His family settled in San Francisco, and he attended Abraham Lincoln High School.

After graduating from high school in 1958 at age 16, Tribe went to Harvard University, where he majored in mathematics and was a member of the Harvard Debate Team that won the intercollegiate National Debate Tournament in 1961. He graduated from Harvard in 1962 with an A.B., summa cum laude.

Tribe then received a National Science Foundation fellowship to pursue doctoral studies in mathematics at Harvard, but dropped out after one year. He decided to attend the Harvard Law School instead, where he was a member of the Harvard Legal Aid Bureau. He graduated from Harvard Law in 1966 with a Juris Doctor magna cum laude.

Tribe married Carolyn Ricarda Kreye in 1964. They divorced in 2008. Their two children, Mark and Kerry, are visual artists.

On May 22, 2013, he was presented with an honorary Doctor of Letters degree from Columbia University during its Class of 2013 commencement.

Career
After graduating from law school, Tribe clerked for justice Mathew Tobriner of the Supreme Court of California from 1966 to 1967, then for justice Potter Stewart of the U.S. Supreme Court from 1967 to 1968. He then joined the Harvard Law School faculty as an assistant professor, receiving tenure in 1972. Among his law students and research assistants while on the faculty at Harvard have been former President Barack Obama (a research assistant for over two years), Chief Justice John Roberts, US Senator Ted Cruz, former D.C. Circuit Chief Judge and Attorney General Merrick Garland, and Associate Justice Elena Kagan. Other notable students of Tribe were U.S. Representative Adam Schiff, Chair of the House Intelligence Committee and lead manager for the first Impeachment of Donald Trump, and Jamie Raskin, lead manager for the second Donald Trump impeachment.

In 1978, Tribe published the first version of what has become one of the core texts on its subject, American Constitutional Law. It has since been updated and expanded a number of times.

In 1983, Tribe represented Unification Church leader Sun Myung Moon in the appeal of his federal conviction on income tax charges.

Tribe represented the restaurant Grendel's Den in the case Larkin v. Grendel's Den in which the restaurant challenged a Massachusetts law that allowed religious establishments to prohibit liquor sales in neighboring properties. The case reached the United States Supreme Court in 1982 and the court overturned the law as violating the separation of church and state. The Lawyer's Guide to Writing Well criticizes the opening of his brief as a "thicket of confusing citations and unnecessary definitions" stating that it would have been "measurably strengthened" if he had used the "more lively imagery" that he had used in a footnote later in the document.

In the 1985 National Gay Task Force v. Board of Education Supreme Court case, Tribe represented the National Gay Task Force who had won an Appeals Court ruling against an Oklahoma law that would have allowed schools to fire teachers who were attracted to people of the same sex or spoke in favor of civil rights for LGBT people. The Supreme Court deadlocked, which left the Appeals Court's favorable ruling in place, declaring the law would have violated the First Amendment.

The Supreme Court ruled against Tribe's client in Bowers v. Hardwick in 1986 and held that a Georgia state law criminalizing sodomy, as applied to consensual acts between persons of the same sex, did not violate fundamental liberties under the principle of substantive due process. However, in 2003 the Supreme Court overruled Bowers in Lawrence v. Texas, a case for which Tribe wrote the ACLU's amicus curiae brief supporting Lawrence, who was represented by Lambda Legal.

Tribe testified at length during the Senate confirmation hearings in 1987 about the Robert Bork Supreme Court nomination, arguing that Bork's stand on the limitation of rights in the Constitution would be unique in the history of the Court. His participation in the hearings raised his profile outside of the legal realm and he became a target of right-wing critics. His phone was later found to have been wiretapped, but it was never discovered who had placed the device or why.

Tribe's 1990 book Abortion: Clash of Absolutes, was called "informative, lucidly written and cogently reasoned" in a review in the Journal of the American Bar Association.

In 1992, Tribe reargued Cipollone v. Liggett Group, Inc., before the Supreme Court on behalf of Cipollone.

Tribe was part of Al Gore's legal team regarding the results of the 2000 United States presidential election. Due to the close nature of the vote count, recounts had been initiated in Florida, and the recounts had been challenged in court. Tribe argued the initial case in Federal Court in Miami in which they successfully argued that the court should not stop the recount of the votes which was taking place and scheduled to take place in certain counties. David Boies argued for the Gore team in a related matter in the Florida State Courts regarding the dates that Secretary of State of Florida Katherine Harris would accept recounts. When the original Federal case, Bush v. Gore, was appealed, Gore and his advisers decided at the last minute to have Boies instead of Tribe argue the case at the Supreme Court. The court determined that recounts of votes should cease and that accordingly George W. Bush had been elected president.

Since the mid-1990s, Tribe has represented a number of corporations advocating for their free speech rights and constitutional personhood. Tribe represented General Electric in its defense against its liability under the Comprehensive Environmental Response, Compensation and Liability Act ("Superfund"), in which GE and Tribe unsuccessfully argued that the act unconstitutionally violated General Electric's due process rights.

In 2014, Tribe was retained to represent Peabody Energy in a suit against the Environmental Protection Agency. Tribe argued that EPA's use of the Clean Air Act to implement its Clean Power Plan was unconstitutional. Tribe's legal analysis has been criticized by other legal commentators, including fellow Harvard Law School professors Richard J. Lazarus and Jody Freeman, who described his conclusion as "wholly without merit". His advocacy for corporations like Peabody has been criticized by some legal experts.

On September 25, 2020, Tribe was named as one of the 25 members of the "Real Facebook Oversight Board", an independent monitoring group over Facebook.

Political involvement
Tribe is one of the co-founders of the liberal American Constitution Society, the law and policy organization formed to counter the conservative Federalist Society, and is one of a number of scholars at Harvard Law School who have expressed their support for animal rights.

Tribe served as a judicial adviser to Barack Obama's 2008 presidential campaign. In February 2010, he was named "Senior Counselor for Access to Justice" in the Department of Justice. He resigned eight months later, citing health reasons.

In December 2016, Tribe and notable lawyers Lawrence Lessig and Andrew Dhuey established The Electors Trust under the aegis of Equal Citizens to provide pro bono legal counsel as well as a secure communications platform for those of the 538 members of the United States Electoral College who were considering a vote of conscience against Donald Trump in the presidential election.

After the dismissal of James Comey in May 2017, Tribe wrote: "The time has come for Congress to launch an impeachment investigation of President Trump for obstruction of justice." Tribe argued that Trump's conduct rose to the level of "high crimes and misdemeanors" that are impeachable offenses under the Constitution. He added: "It will require serious commitment to constitutional principle, and courageous willingness to put devotion to the national interest above self-interest and party loyalty, for a Congress of the president's own party to initiate an impeachment inquiry."

Tribe is on the board of the Renew Democracy Initiative, an American political organization founded in 2017 to promote and defend liberal democracy in the U.S. and abroad.

In 2004, Tribe acknowledged having plagiarized several phrases and a sentence in his 1985 book, God Save this Honorable Court, from a 1974 book by Henry Abraham. After an investigation, Tribe was reprimanded by Harvard for "a significant lapse in proper academic practice," but the investigation concluded that Tribe did not intend to plagiarize.

Tribe has stirred controversy due to his promotion of conspiracy theories about Donald Trump's fitness for the presidency. Dartmouth political scientist Brendan Nyhan harshly criticized Tribe, saying that he "has become an important vector of misinformation and conspiracy theories on Twitter." According to McKay Coppins of The Atlantic, Tribe has been "an especially active booster" of the Palmer Report, "a liberal blog known for peddling conspiracy theories". Tribe removed the posted tweets following the Palmer Report and contests the accuracy of the story of controversy.

Cases

The following is a list of cases Tribe has argued in the Supreme Court, as of the end of 2005:

Tribe has argued 26 cases in the U.S. Circuit Courts of Appeals:

Publications
Books
To End a Presidency: The Power of Impeachment (2018; co-author with Joshua Matz)
Uncertain Justice: The Roberts Court and the Constitution (2014; co-author with Joshua Matz)
The Invisible Constitution (2008)
American Constitutional Law (treatise; 1978, 1979, 1988, and 2000)
On Reading the Constitution (1991; co-author with Michael Dorf)
Abortion: The Clash of Absolutes (1990)
Constitutional Choices (1985)
God Save This Honorable Court: How the Choice of Supreme Court Justices Shapes Our History (1985)
The Supreme Court: Trends and Developments (1979, 1980, 1982, 1983)
When Values Conflict: Essays on Environmental Analysis, Discourse, and Decision (editor; 1976)
The American Presidency: Its Constitutional Structure (1974)
Channeling Technology Through Law (1973)
Environmental Protection (1971; co-author with Louis Jaffe)
Technology: Processes of Assessment and Choice (1969)

See also 
 Bill Clinton Supreme Court candidates
 List of law clerks of the Supreme Court of the United States (Seat 8)

References

Bibliography
 Leila Schneps and Coralie Colmez, Math on trial. How numbers get used and abused in the courtroom, Basic Books, Chapter 2 (2013); .

External links

Laurence H. Tribe | Harvard Law School

Laurence Tribe essays at ScotusBlog
 washingtonpost.com May 13, 2017: Trump must be impeached. Here’s why.
 

1941 births
American legal writers
Chinese Jews
Educators from Shanghai
Harvard College alumni
Harvard Law School alumni
Harvard Law School faculty
Jewish American attorneys
Law clerks of the Supreme Court of the United States
Lawyers from San Francisco
Living people
American scholars of constitutional law